The discography of American hip hop singer and producer Ester Dean consists of 18 singles and an extended play. Her debut single, "Drop It Low", featuring Chris Brown, peaked on the Billboard Hot 100 at number 38.

Extended plays

Soundtrack albums

Singles

As featured artist

Other appearances

Music videos

References

Notes 

Discographies of American artists